Ross Lee McKay (born March 3, 1964) is a Canadian former professional ice hockey goaltender who played in one National Hockey League game for the Hartford Whalers during the 1990–91 season. In this game, on March 17, 1991, he played 35 minutes against the Buffalo Sabres, allowing 3 goals on 15 shots. The rest of his career, which lasted from 1988 to 1991, he played in various minor leagues.

Career
From 1981 to 1984 McKay played major junior hockey for the Calgary Wranglers of the Western Hockey League. He then played for the University of Saskatchewan for four years before signing a professional contract with National Hockey League team the Hartford Whalers in 1988. He split the following two season between the Indianapolis Ice of the IHL, the Knoxville Cherokees of the ECHL and the Binghamton Whalers of the AHL. During the 1990-91 season McKay made his NHL debut, playing 35 minutes of relief against the Buffalo Sabres and he helped the Whalers AHL affiliate the Springfield Falcons win the Calder Cup.

McKay served as team physician and an assistant coach for the NAHL Chicago Freeze from 1999 to 2001.

Career statistics

Regular season and playoffs

Personal life
After his playing career ended McKay became a chiropractor and practices in Westmont, Illinois. His son Dryden McKay is a goalie with the Toronto Marlies, having previously played with the Minnesota State of the Western Collegiate Hockey Association.

See also
List of players who played only one game in the NHL

References

External links

1964 births
Living people
Binghamton Whalers players
Calgary Wranglers (WHL) players
Canadian ice hockey goaltenders
Hartford Whalers players
Indianapolis Ice players
Knoxville Cherokees players
Saskatchewan Huskies ice hockey players
Ice hockey people from Edmonton
Springfield Indians players
Undrafted National Hockey League players